The Ratua Khola (Nenglish: Ratuwa Riveria) (Nepali: रतुवा खोला) is a river in eastern part of Nepal. It originates from Chure Pahad of Nepal and merges with the Kankai River in Bihar, India. This river serves as the eastern border of Damak, a big and developed city in the eastern part of Nepal. This river also touches chilhara village.

References

Rivers of Koshi Province
Rivers of Bihar
International rivers of Asia
Rivers of India